Kiamba, officially the Municipality of Kiamba (Jawi: ايڠايد نو كيامب), is a 1st class municipality in the province of Sarangani, Philippines. According to the 2020 census, it has a population of 65,774 people.

It is bordered on the west by Maitum, on the east by Maasim, on the north by South Cotabato, and on the south by the Celebes Sea.

Notable residents include Manny Pacquiao. It is the hometown of his wife Jinkee Pacquiao.

History 
The area of what is now known as MAKIMA was first inhabited by T'boli tribes people who mostly occupied the highlands. The lowlands and plains were mostly occupied by Maguindanaons who migrated from the Maguindanao area and the Sangil people who mostly are from Balut and Sangili islands, occupied the areas near the sea. The Ilocanos who are originally from Luzon only came to the area around 1920's onwards as they heed the governments homesteading and resettlement plan.

The municipality was formed on August 18, 1947, when Executive Order No. 82 was signed by the government by merging the municipal districts of Kraan and Kling.

Maitum on the west became an independent municipality in 1959. In 1971, Maasim, on the east, also became an independent municipality.

Geography

Barangays
Kiamba is politically subdivided into 19 barangays.

Climate

Demographics

The majority of the population speak Cebuano although early settlers were of Ilocano origin. There are a lot of Moro people (Sangil and Maguindanaon) who settles in the area long before the Christians from Luzon came. One of the indigenous peoples living in mountainous areas of Kiamba is known as T'boli.

Economy 

The economy of Kiamba is largely based on agriculture with vast ricefields surrounding the municipality. Aqua-culture is the second biggest income earner, notably the culture of milkfish  and shrimps (locally called "sugpo" or "lukon") for export. Also, coastal communities depend on deep-sea fishing as a primary livelihood.

Tourism 
The Timpuyog festival celebrates the town's foundation anniversary. Timpuyog is an Ilocano word for unity, and the festival includes tribal shows and carnaval. Kiamba celebrate their Timpuyog Festival and Foundation Anniversary every February 14.

Visitors attractions include:
 Waterfalls in lush rainforests (ex. Nalus Falls)
 Short, narrow roads lined with Japanese era houses
 Cockfights
 Tuka Marine Park, a protected area where fishing is banned. It has four protected coves and only one (Tuka 2) is open to the public. The site has coral formations.
 Beaches of Kiamba (ex. Wakap Beach in Datu Dani)
 Kiamba Philippines was mentioned in the Uncharted movie.

Education
Kiamba National High School
Notre Dame of Kiamba
Southern Cotabato Academy
J.B.T. Caing Sr. Memorial Integrated School
James L. Chiongbian National Trade School (Formerly Kling National High school)
Cabales-Enarbia Integrated School
Salakit National High School
Goldenstate College of Kiamba
Euro Asia College of Technology Incorporated

References

External links
 Kiamba Profile at PhilAtlas.com
 Kiamba Profile at the DTI Cities and Municipalities Competitive Index
 Kiamba Municipal Profile at the Province of Sarangani Official Website
 
 [ Philippine Standard Geographic Code]
 Philippine Census Information
 Local Governance Performance Management System

Municipalities of Sarangani
Establishments by Philippine executive order